Giovanni Aleotti (born 25 May 1999) is an Italian cyclist, who currently rides for UCI WorldTeam .

Major results

2017
 3rd Trofeo Guido Dorigo
2018
 7th Overall Tour of Romania
 8th Gran Premio Sportivi di Poggiana
2019
 1st Trofeo Edil C
 2nd Time trial, National Under-23 Road Championships
 2nd Overall Tour de l'Avenir
 2nd Overall Carpathian Couriers Race
 2nd Gran Premio Sportivi di Poggiana
 2nd Giro del Belvedere
 3rd G.P. Palio del Recioto
 3rd Trofeo Piva
 6th Giro del Medio Brenta
2020
 1st  Road race, National Under-23 Road Championships
 4th Overall Giro Ciclistico d'Italia
2021
 1st  Overall Sibiu Cycling Tour
1st  Young rider classification
1st Stage 1
 2nd Circuito de Getxo
 3rd Overall Settimana Ciclistica Italiana 
1st  Young rider classification
2022
 1st  Overall Sibiu Cycling Tour
1st Stages 2 & 3a (ITT)
 7th Grand Prix Cycliste de Montréal

Grand Tour general classification results timeline

References

External links

1999 births
Living people
Italian male cyclists
People from Mirandola
Cyclists from Emilia-Romagna
Sportspeople from the Province of Modena
21st-century Italian people